Faris Handžić (born 27 May 1995) is a Bosnian professional footballer who plays as a midfielder for Serbian club Novi Pazar.

Club career
As a youth player, Handžić trialed for the youth academies of Spanish La Liga side Espanyol and one of Italy's most successful clubs, Inter Milan. At the age of 16, he debuted for Bosnian Premier League club Sarajevo, one of the country's most successful teams, where he won the 2013–14 Bosnian Cup.

Before the second half of the 2014–15 season, Handžić signed with Westerlo in the Belgian top flight, where he made 3 league appearances. Before the second half of the 2015–16 season, he joined Slovak Second Division outfit Dukla Banská Bystrica. Before the second half of the 2016–17 season, Handžić signed with First League of FBiH club Velež Mostar.

In August 2019, he joined also First League of FBiH side Olimpik after playing for Vinogradar in the 3. HNL. On 26 May 2020, the 2019–20 First League of FBiH season ended abruptly due to the COVID-19 pandemic in Bosnia and Herzegovina and, by default, Handžić with Olimpik were crowned league champions and got promoted back to the Bosnian Premier League.

International career
Handžić represented the Bosnia and Herzegovina U17 national team in 2011, making 3 caps for the team.

Honours
Sarajevo
Bosnian Cup: 2013–14

References

External links

1995 births
Living people
Footballers from Sarajevo
Bosnia and Herzegovina footballers
Bosnia and Herzegovina youth international footballers
Association football midfielders
Premier League of Bosnia and Herzegovina players
Belgian Pro League players
2. Liga (Slovakia) players
First League of the Federation of Bosnia and Herzegovina players
Serbian SuperLiga players
FK Sarajevo players
K.V.C. Westerlo players
FK Dukla Banská Bystrica players
FK Velež Mostar players
FK Igman Konjic players
NK Vinogradar players
FK Olimpik players
FK Novi Pazar players
Bosnia and Herzegovina expatriate footballers
Expatriate footballers in Slovakia
Expatriate footballers in Belgium
Expatriate footballers in Croatia
Expatriate footballers in Serbia
Bosnia and Herzegovina expatriate sportspeople in Slovakia
Bosnia and Herzegovina expatriate sportspeople in Belgium
Bosnia and Herzegovina expatriate sportspeople in Croatia
Bosnia and Herzegovina expatriate sportspeople in Serbia